Antoniette Oliveira is a Gabonese politician. She served as Minister of Social Affairs and Women in 1980. She was the first woman cabinet minister in Gabon.

See also
Politics of Gabon

References

Government ministers of Gabon
20th-century women politicians
Women government ministers of Gabon
Living people
Year of birth missing (living people)
Place of birth missing (living people)